Celia María Damestoi (27 September 1928 – 4 August 2013), better known as Lilian Valmar, was an Argentine actress and vedette.

Biography
Lilian Valmar was born in Argentina, coming of age during the country's golden period of cinema which spanned from 1947 to 1956. She began her career in 1947 in the film Albéniz by Luis César Amadori.

She then began the second phase of her career within the New Wave movement (1960–1966) with director Enrique Carreras, who directed her in a trilogy of films. In television she entered the golden age of telenovelas (1971–1985), appearing in her first in 1971 with 's .

In theater she showed her talent as a vedette, and later as a dramatic actress, forming a company with Enrique Serrano in 1956.

Lilian Valmar died of natural causes on 4 August 2013 at age 84. Her remains rest in the  pantheon of La Chacarita cemetery.

Films

 Albéniz (1947) 
 Song of Dolores (1947) 
 Vacaciones (1947)
 The Tango Returns to Paris (1948) 
 El cantor del pueblo (1948) 
  (1948) 
 The Bohemian Soul (1949) 
 Avivato (1949)
 Ritmo, amor y picardía (1955)
  (1956)
 Catita es una dama (1956) 
  (1960) 
 Un viaje al más allá (1964)
 Arm in Arm Down the Street (1966)

TV series
  (1971)
 Me llaman gorrión, Channel 9 (1972)
  (1973)
 Entre el amor y el poder, Channel 9 (1984)
 , Channel 9 (1985)

Theater
 Boina blanca (1956)
 Blum, play by Enrique Santos Discépolo and Julio Porter, together with Zulma Faiad, Juan Verdaguer, and Silvia Legrand (1963)
 Los cocodrilos (1966)
 Payasín y Bonín (1966)
 El caso del señor Valdemar, together with

References

External links

 

1928 births
2013 deaths
20th-century Argentine actresses
Actresses from Buenos Aires
Argentine film actresses
Argentine radio actresses
Argentine stage actresses
Argentine telenovela actresses
Argentine vedettes